Vaudeville News (1920-19??) was a weekly newspaper created by the Vaudeville tycoon E.F. Albee in 1920 It was intended for Vaudeville actors and their managers to provide news, information, and advertising to those in the business.

References

External links 
 Illinois Digital Newspaper Collections: Vaudeville News (1920-1929)

Weekly newspapers published in the United States
Newspapers established in 1920
Vaudeville